Nicolás Gastón Falczuk (born 16 November 1986) is a former Argentine-Israeli professional association football.

Playing career 
Falczuk put pen to paper on 4 August 2010 after impressing in a pre-season camp in Slovenia. Hapoel Acre have announced that they will work on getting Falczuk Israeli citizenship via the Law of Return for people of Jewish background.

References 

1986 births
Living people
Israeli Jews
Argentine Jews
Jewish Argentine sportspeople
Jewish footballers
Argentine footballers
Deportivo Morón footballers
Hapoel Acre F.C. players
Hapoel Be'er Sheva F.C. players
Maccabi Petah Tikva F.C. players
F.C. Ashdod players
Hapoel Ramat Gan F.C. players
Hapoel Nof HaGalil F.C. players
Hapoel Iksal F.C. players
Hapoel Migdal HaEmek F.C. players
Liga Leumit players
Israeli Premier League players
Argentine emigrants to Israel
Association football forwards 
Association football midfielders